Odd One Out is a British game show based on the American version entitled Knockout. It aired on BBC1 from 16 April 1982 to 19 April 1985 and was hosted by Paul Daniels. The show is based on a short-lived American game show produced by Ralph Edwards called Knockout, hosted by Arte Johnson.

Gameplay
The object of Odd One Out is to guess which one of four items does not belong and why it doesn't belong. After the player has successfully identified the odd one out, he/she can either guess the explanation or challenge his/her opponents to guess. Choosing the correct item would score two points, and figuring out why it didn't belong by guessing the common bond of the other three or a successful challenge is worth three points more, for a total of five points.

Six contestants appeared each week with 3 contestants playing in the first half and the other 3 playing in the second half of the programme. The leader at the end of each game won a chance to play a bonus game for a nice prize.

Bonus Game
In the bonus game, the winning player is given up to three clues within which to guess the common bond between them. A correct answer wins a prize according to how many clues are used; using all three clues wins a small prize, using two wins a medium prize, and using just the first clue wins a large prize.

After both winners play their bonus round, they face off in the final game.

The Final Game
In the final game, pictures, sounds, and words are played in each question. Scoring remains the same. When time runs out, the player with the most points goes on to play the end game for a grand prize.

The End Game
The End Game is played the same as the bonus games, except for the fact that the winning player only gets one clue. The player can choose to see clue from the top, middle, or bottom; then host Daniels tells the player that the clue is easy, medium, or hard. After that, the player has five seconds to think it over and then guess the common bond. If he/she is correct, the winning player wins the grand prize.

Champion's Rule
Originally, players could stay on the show as long as they won. During the final series, however, champions stayed for a maximum of three shows.

Transmissions

External links

1980s British game shows
1982 British television series debuts
1985 British television series endings
BBC television game shows